

Cunda Island, also called Alibey Island,, Greek Moschonisi ( or Μοσχόνησος), is the largest of the Ayvalık Islands archipelago in Turkey, which was historically called the Εκατόνησα (Hekatonisa) or Μοσχονήσια (Moschonisia) archipelago in Greek.

History

Antiquity 
According to written sources, there have been settlements since the antiquity; the sources mention the settlements of Nasos, Pordoselini or Pordoselene and Chalkis.

20th Century 

According to the Ottoman General Census of 1881/82-1893, the kaza of Cunda (Yunda) had a total population of 4.671, consisting of 4.417 Greeks, 89 Muslims and 165 foreign citizens.

Until the Treaty of Lausanne (1923) the entire population of the island was Greek.
In 1913, Mehmed Reshid visited the island and he suggested the settlement of wealthy Muslim muhacirs on the island in order to control the Greek population. In 1914, persecution against the population started, resulting in the departure of many inhabitants from the island. The bishop Photios, various priests and prominent men were seized, beaten and imprisoned in a mill, to be released only after some days had passed. Men and women were beaten and tortured. Later, the inhabitants were deported to Aivali (the Greek name for Ayvalık) on the mainland without being allowed to take anything with them. In Aivali they shared the same fate of oppression with its Christian inhabitants until they were all deported, and scattered among the Turkish villages of the vilayets of Izmir and Bursa. There they were daily subjected to all kinds of persecutions and dying in great numbers. The churches on the island were looted and turned into warehouses and stables, the lamps and holy images in them were broken, paintings of art destroyed and houses rendered uninhabitable. In 1915, inhabitants of the island were compelled to pay 2,500 Turkish pounds for the uniforms of the Turkish army and 2,000 Turkish pounds for the construction of barracks; to pay a wheat-tax for the upkeep of the navy, and to buy, at no cheap price, post-cards. Also, some inhabitants were killed and tortured.

For a short period (1921–1922), the island was the see of a Greek Orthodox metropolitan bishop, while the neoclassical mansion of the last metropolitan, Ambrosios, who was executed by the Turkish army, still survives on the seafront of the island's town center. On September 19, 1922 several hundred of the Greek islanders were killed on Cunda; only some children were spared and sent to orphanages. The next year, following the Treaty of Lausanne and the population exchange between Greece and Turkey, the few remaining islanders were forced to leave for Greece and were replaced by Cretan Turks and Turks from Lesbos.

Present day 

Cunda Island has the character of a typical Aegean resort town. There are frequent bus and ferry services to Cunda Island from the town center of Ayvalık. Cunda Island is connected to Lale Island, and thence to the mainland, by a bridge and causeway built in the late 1960s. This is the first and currently the oldest surviving bridge in Turkey that connects lands separated by a strait.

The main landmark of Cunda Island remains the Taxiarchis Church. The large, former Greek Orthodox cathedral was abandoned and dilapidated, but has now been restored and houses one of the Rahmi M. Koç Museums. Poroselene bay in the north of the island is among Cunda's main sights. In antiquity, it was the home of a dolphin which saved a drowning boy, according to a story mentioned by Pausanias.

In 2007, after a two-year work, all 551 buildings in Cunda Island were inspected and registered by the Turkish Science Academy and Yıldız Technical University Faculty of Architecture, as part of the "Culture of Turkey inventory project".

USA-based Harvard University and Turkey's Koç University have established a joint project in Cunda Island and run a "Harvard-Koç University Intensive Ottoman & Turkish Summer School" every summer.

The Ayvalık Strait Bridge connects Cunda Island with Lale Island.

In 2020, the Greek monastery of Saint Demetrius, also known as Ai Dimitri Monastery, which has been built in 1766 with donations from the citizens of Cunda, was completely destroyed by treasure hunters.

Gallery

See also
List of islands of Turkey
Aegean Islands

References

External links

Cunda Adası
Cunda Adası
Cunda Adası

Islands of Turkey
Ayvalık
North Aegean islands
Populated places in Balıkesir Province
Fishing communities in Turkey
Islands of Balıkesir Province
Places of the Greek genocide
Former Greek towns in Turkey